Promi Big Brother 2019, also known as Promi Big Brother 7 was the seventh season of the German reality television series Promi Big Brother. The show began airing on 9 August 2019 on Sat.1 and ended after 17 days on 23 August 2019. It was the seventh season of the Big Brother in total to air on Sat.1 to date. Jochen Schropp and Marlene Lufen both returned as hosts of the show.

Janine Meissner was announced as the winner of the season, with Joey Heindle as the runner-up.

Production

Eye logo
The eye was released on 26 June 2019 and features a design from the British version. From the United Kingdom, Promi Big Brother has now adopted the idea of putting a star in the center of the eye.

Teasers
On 19 July 2019, a forty-seconds teaser was released promoting the season.

Opening Intro
The song of this year intro and outro is "An guten Tagen" from Johannes Oerding. Like the previous season, the intro for the matches is "The Hanging Tree" from James Newton Howard feat. Jennifer Lawrence.

House
The official house pictures were released on 8 August 2019. As in previous seasons, the Promi Big Brother house features two sides. "Alles" or Everything is a luxury summer escape where the housemates can enjoy food and relax without a care in the world. "Nichts" or Nothing has limited supplies, rough sleeping arrangements, and a harsh environment to survive in.

This year there is an overall theme for the house which is Camping. There is not an actual "house". Both sides of the compound feature and open air environment leaving the housemates exposed to the elements.

The luxury camp features a modern "glamping" style, including a kitchen with fridge and oven, beds, spacious safari style tents and a hot tub. The poor side however modeled after a run down campsite, with backpackers tents, sleeping bags, no food and a cold shower.

Twists

Move In
The first 9 housemates moved in on Wednesday, August 7 two days before the live show. All 9 moved into the campsite area of the house and were only allowed to choose one personal item to bring with them. Big Brother provided the housemates with a basic care kit including toiletries, a sleeping bag, and a mat. On the 1st live show on August 9, Almklausi, Sylvia, and Zlatko moved into the house.

Returning Players
On Day 3, Big Brother Germany 1 housemate Zlatko Trpkovski entered the house after over a decade of being away from the media.

Shopping Challenges
Each day the "Nothing" housemates will receive €1 per person per day for shopping. Big Brother will give tasks and challenges in order to earn extra money to spend in the shopping center located in the house. The housemates will only receive 60 seconds of shopping time to buy items with their shopping budget.

Housemates
On August 6, 2019, were announced the first nine celebrities housemates to be participating in the season were Christos, Eva, Ginger, Janine, Joey, Jürgen, Lilo, Tobias and Theresia. Sylvia was announced the next day as the tenth celebrity housemate. The eleventh celebrity housemate was announced on August 8, it was Zlatko. The twelfth and final celebrity housemate was announced on launch day, it was Almklausi.

On August 7, 2019, nine out of twelve housemates entered the Big Brother house before the broadcast of the show. On August 9, 2019, the last three housemates entered the house.

Almklausi
Almklausi (born April 5, 1969), is a German Singer. He entered the House on Day 3. He became the eighth housemate to be evicted on Day 16.

Christos Manazidis
Christos "Chris" Manazidis (born October 2, 1986), is a German YouTuber. His YouTube-Channel name is "Bullshit-TV" and thrills more than 1.8 million subscribers. He entered the House on Day 1. He became the fifth housemate to be evicted on Day 13.

Eva Benetatou
Eva Benetatou (born April 6, 1992), is a German reality television personality. She began her career after placing second on the 2019 season of Der Bachelor. She entered the House on Day 1. She became the first housemate to be evicted on Day 10.

Ginger Costello Wollersheim
Ginger Costello Wollersheim (born June 17, 1986), was a stripper and now is a webcam girl, known as the wife of television personality Bert Wollersheim. She entered the House on Day 1. She became the fourth housemate to be evicted on Day 13.

Janine Meissner
Janine "Pink" Meissner (born April 8, 1987), is an actress. She began her career as "Yvonne Voss" in the soap Köln 50667. After five years with Köln 50667 it was time for a change of scenery. The character "Yvonne" stayed, but in the new show Leben.Lieben.Leipzig, which was designed especially for Meissner in the lead role. She entered the House on Day 1. On Day 17, it was announced that Janine had won the series.

Joey Heindle
Joey Heindle (born May 14, 1993), is a German singer, which his began his career after placing fifth on the ninth season of Deutschland sucht den Superstar. In 2013, he appeared on the seventh season of Ich bin ein Star – Holt mich hier raus!, which he won the season. In 2018, Heindle appeared on second season of Global Gladiators. He secured the 3rd place. He entered the House on Day 1. He left the house on Day 17 after coming runner-up.

Jürgen Trovato
Jürgen Trovato (born June 21, 1962), is Germany's most famous TV detective. From 2011 until 2017, he and his wife Marta and daughter Sharon, they were detectives on the television show Die Trovatos – Detektive decken auf. He entered the House on Day 1. He became the third housemate to be evicted on Day 12.

Lilo von Kiesenwetter
Lilo von Kiesenwetter (born March 25, 1954), is a German Clairvoyance. Many celebrities, such as Udo Walz, Jean Pütz or Jil Sander, rely on Lilo's skills as a clairvoyance. She has been practicing this profession for over 40 years. She entered the House on Day 1. She became the seventh housemate to be evicted on Day 15.

Sylvia Leifheit
Sylvia Leifheit (born December 3, 1975), is an actress, model, entrepreneur and author. After a longer modeling career, Sylvia conquered the TV screens after an acting agent had become aware of her at an event in Berlin. She attended the casting for the television season Sterne des Südens and was included in the regular team in 1995. She entered the House on Day 3. She became the sixth housemate to be evicted on Day 14.

Tobias Wegener
Tobias "Tobi" Wegener (born March 13, 1993), is a German reality television personality. He began his career after placing second on the 2018 season of Love Island. He entered the House on Day 1. He left the house on Day 17 in third place.

Theresia Fischer
Theresia Fischer (born March 31, 1992), is a model. She began her career after placing 11th on the fourteenth season of Germany's Next Topmodel. Fischer lives with her 27-year-old husband Thomas in Hamburg. The pair took on the "yes" word in a very special way: The model and the documentary filmmaker got married in front of cameras during the Germany's Next Topmodel finals in Düsseldorf. She entered the House on Day 1. She left the house on Day 17 in fourth place.

Zlatko Trpkovski
Zlatko Trpkovski (born January 1, 1976), was a housemate on the first season of Big Brother Germany, he was evicted on Day 41 and he reserved the 10th place. He entered the Promi Big  Brother House on Day 3. He became the second housemate to be evicted on Day 11.

Distribution of housemates

Match Arena
This year duels have been renamed "matches" in which only poor housemates will participate. One or more housemates will participate in each duel in order to earn more money for their shopping budget. The housemates automatically receive €1 per person per day. Each task completed within the match will earn the housemates €1 extra. Upon successful completion of a match housemates are offered the chance to double their winnings, however failure to complete the doubling challenge will result in the loss of all winnings earning the housemates only the base amount.

 The housemates won the match
 The housemates lost the match

Notes

 For health reasons, Lilo was not allowed to compete.
 In this match the housemates played in pairs. The Pairs were: Almklausi and Sylvia, Christos and Ginger, Eva and Theresia, Janine and Tobias. Lilo didn't have a partner and so she didn't play.
 The housemates doubled their profits for €5. The pair that played was Janine and Tobias.
 Jürgen left the match and didn't play.
 The housemates didn't double their profits for €1.
 The housemates of the luxury camp played for the housemates of the tent camp for an extra budget of €8 . Since they lost, the luxury camp housemates also had to live in the tent camp.
 If three contestants had successfully completed the game, the campsite tent camp would have also got video messages from their family and friends.

Duel Arena 
From Day 9, the live duels took place again. Big Brother each appoint one or two housemates from the "area" who must compete at the Duel Arena. In the Duel Arena, they both played a game and the loser must face the consequences for his living area.

Nominations table

Notes

: Tobias and Zlatko were able to select for their duel win each three housemates of their area, which received nomination protection. Tobias chose to safe Janine, Joey and himself and Zlatko decided to safe Almklausi, Lilo and Sylvia. 
: Almklausi, Lilo and Sylvia were able to protect one of themselves for the nomination by winning the match. They chose Lilo.
: The tent camp had to put a housemate on the nomination list as a result of the lost match. They chose Tobias.
: Since more women than men were in the house, the male housemates were not allowed to be nominated.
: Because of an accident in Day 13's live duel, Almklausi was taken to hospital and therefore was exempt from both rounds of nominations and could not be nominated in the 2nd round. He returned to the house on Day 14.
: For the won duel, the complete luxury camp (Janine, Joey and Tobias) received nomination protection.
: For the won duel, Joey received nomination protection.

Ratings

References

External links 
Official Homepage

2019 German television seasons
07